Local elections were held in the Gambia on 12 April 2018.

References 

Local
Local elections in the Gambia
Gambia